The 2010 Samsung Mobile 500 was the eighth race of the 2010 NASCAR Sprint Cup Series season at Texas Motor Speedway in Fort Worth, Texas. It was scheduled to start at 3:00 p.m. EST on April 18, 2010, but because of poor weather conditions it was delayed until noon EDT on April 19 on Fox, and was broadcast on PRN radio at 2:00 pm EDT. This  was the first race on a mile and a half track that cars had  the new rear spoilers installed, which altered their aerodynamic features. The race had 12 different leaders, 31 lead changes, seven caution flags and one red flag. Denny Hamlin won the race, and would go on to also win the fall race.

Background

Entry list

Race report

Practices and qualifying

During the first practice on April 16 the fastest drivers were Greg Biffle, Juan Pablo Montoya, David Reutimann, David Gilliland, and Bobby Labonte. In qualifying, the top-five fastest were Tony Stewart, Sam Hornish Jr., Greg Biffle, Jimmie Johnson, and Kasey Kahne, while David Stremme, Terry Cook, and Johnny Sauter did not qualify. On April 17, both scheduled practices were canceled because of rain showers in the area.

Race summary
The race was scheduled to start on Sunday, April 18, 2010, but rain delayed the event until noon EDT on Monday, April 19. At 12:01 EDT, pre race events began  with Dr. Roger Marsh from TXARM-Texas Alliance Raceway Ministries giving the invocation; then Country legend Charley Pride performed the national anthem. Tammy King, who was a contest winner, gave the command: "Gentlemen, Start Your Engines!" Also, because of the rain delay, NASCAR decided to schedule a competition caution on lap 25.

The race began at 12:19 p.m. EDT with Tony Stewart the leader in pole position. Stewart led until lap 16 when he was passed by Greg Biffle. By lap 20 Stewart had fallen to third. Five laps later, the competition caution came out. Tony Stewart was first off  pit road and had the lead. The green flag waved on lap 32 while Stewart was still the leader. Stewart led until lap 48 when Jimmie Johnson passed him. Johnson led the race until lap 76 at which point Dale Earnhardt Jr. passed him. One lap later, the second caution, caused by Brian Vickers colliding with the wall, came out.  On the restart, Stewart led them to the green flag start on lap 83. The race stayed green until the third caution came out on lap 100. The caution was caused by the spin of Brian Vickers' car in turn three. After all cars had pitted, Earnhardt Jr. became the leader on the lap 104 restart. Shortly after the restart, on lap 111, the fourth caution waved because Sam Hornish Jr. spun in turn four. The restart was on lap 116 with Earnhardt Jr. the leader, but a lap later, on lap 117, Jamie McMurray passed him for the lead.

Subsequently,  McMurray was in front until lap 127 when Earnhardt Jr. passed him. Earnhardt Jr. led until lap 137 at which point Jeff Gordon passed him. The race experienced a long run from lap 116 to lap 235. Gordon led until lap 166 when he came to pit road for a green flag pit stop; Juan Pablo Montoya passed him. Montoya then pitted leaving the lead for Earnhardt Jr. Gordon  passed Earnhardt Jr. on lap 182 for the lead in turn two. Jeff Gordon, around lap 205, entered heavy traffic that slowed him down and caused him to be passed by Jimmie Johnson. Once out of the heavy traffic Gordon took away the lead from Johnson. For the next ten laps green flag pit stops occurred. The top-five after the pit stops was Jimmie Johnson, Jeff Gordon, Dale Earnhardt Jr., Denny Hamlin, and David Reutimann. Then, on lap 227, Gordon passed Johnson for the lead. The fifth caution came out on lap 232 because Montoya collided with the wall. All lead lap cars pitted; the leader on the lap 236 restart was Tony Stewart.

Stewart led until lap 253 because Jeff Gordon passed him. From lap 271 to 291 the race had green flag pit stops; after they were finished Gordon was the leader. Seventeen laps later, on lap 310 the sixth caution came out because of engine problems with David Reutimann's car. On restart, on lap 316, Jeff Burton led them to the green flag. A lap afterwards, the race was red flagged for a large crash exiting the quad-oval. The accident was caused by Tony Stewart getting clipped by Carl Edwards as a group of cars tried to go four-wide. The cars involved were Carl Edwards, Tony Stewart, Jeff Gordon, A. J. Allmendinger, Jamie McMurray, Joey Logano, Juan Pablo Montoya, Paul Menard, and Clint Bowyer. The race was red-flagged for 19 minutes to allow for cleanup to proceed. The restart with Jeff Burton the leader happened on lap 322. On lap 323, Denny Hamlin passed Burton for the lead. On lap 333, the white flag was waved for Hamlin. Jimmie Johnson, who started sixth on the last restart, was catching Hamlin, but Johnson did not have enough time. The race was Hamlin's second win of the season, and his tenth of his career.

Race results

References

Samsung Mobile 500
Samsung Mobile 500
2010s in Fort Worth, Texas
NASCAR races at Texas Motor Speedway